Association Sportive Mira is a football club from Papetoai, Moorea, French Polynesia. It currently competes in the Ligue 2 Moorea, the regional league of Moorea. They were the first team from there to compete in Ligue 1, in the season 1999–00.

Achievements
Ligue 2 Moorea
Champions (2): 2014–15, 2018–19

Last seasons

References

External links
Club's Facebook page

Football clubs in French Polynesia
Football clubs in Mo'orea
Association football clubs established in 1949
1949 establishments in French Polynesia